Nienaber is a surname. Notable people with the surname include:

Jacques Nienaber (born 1972), South African rugby union coach
Wickus Nienaber (born 1981), Swazi swimmer
Wilco Nienaber (born 2000), South African golfer